Obata Kagenori (小幡景憲) (1572–1663), also known as Obata Kanbē (小幡勘兵衛), was a Confucian scholar and samurai retainer of the Takeda clan during Japan's Sengoku period. He is perhaps most well known for his completion of the Kōyō Gunkan, the chronicle of the Takeda clan's military campaigns begun by Kōsaka Masanobu, and for founding the Kōshū-ryū Gungaku, a school for studying the arts of war.

Kagenori was the third son of Obata Masamori, and fought under Tokugawa Ieyasu at the battle of Sekigahara in 1600, and at the siege of Osaka fifteen years later.

References
Frederic, Louis (2002). Japan Encyclopedia. Cambridge, Massachusetts: Harvard University Press.

1572 births
1663 deaths
Samurai